Boxing is one of the sports at the quadrennial Commonwealth Games competition. It has been a Commonwealth Games sport since the inaugural edition of the event's precursor, the 1930 British Empire Games. It is a core sport and must be included in the sporting programme of each edition of the Games.

Editions

All-time medal table
Updated after the 2022 Commonwealth Games

External links
 Commonwealth Games sport index

References

 
Sports at the Commonwealth Games
Commonwealth Games
Commonwealth Games